Lucky Enam (born 14 September 1952) is a Bangladeshi television and theatre personality. She was awarded Ekushey Padak by the Government of Bangladesh in 2019. She is the current chairperson of Bangladesh Shishu Academy since September 2019.

Background
Enam was born on 14 September 1952 in Rangpur to Kalimullah Bhuiyan and Mohua. She completed her SSC from SV Girl's School and HSC from Comilla Women's College. She then earned her bachelor's and master's in economics from the University of Chittagong and University of Dhaka respectively.

Career
Enam began performing in 1972 by joining the theater troupe Nagorik Natya Sampradaya.  She first appeared in a dual role in the play Anubhabe Anubhutee with Pijush Bandyopadhyay in 1987. Her notable roles include Kona in Sharoma, Ambia in Nuruldiner Sarajibon, Ms. Esha in Bohubrihi and Boro Bou in Ayomoy.

Enam is the co-founder and general secretary of the theatre troupe Nagorik Nattyangan. She directed several stage plays including Ami Birangana Bolchi, Sharoma, Pragoitihashik, Sheishob Dinguli, Bideha, Muktir Upaye and Kritodasher Hashi. She also directed television drama serials Amader Ananda Bari, based on Enamul Huq's novel Greehobashi Galpo and Shesh Rakkha.

In 2012, Nagorik Nattyangan and Bangladesh Shilpakala Academy arranged a six-day theatre festival to celebrate the 60th birthday of Enam at the National Theatre Hall, Dhaka.

Personal life
Enam was married to actor, theatre activist and academic Enamul Huq. Together they had two daughters – Hridi Huq and Proitee Huq.

Awards
 Award of Honour for dedication in theatre (1984) 
 Shilpakala Padak in 2014 by Bangladesh Shilpakala Academy
 Ekushey Padak (2019)

Works
Television
 Ayomoy (1988)
 Bohubrihi (1988)
 Kothao Keu Nei (1990)

References

External links
 

1952 births
Living people
People from Rangpur District
University of Chittagong alumni
University of Dhaka alumni
Bangladeshi television actresses
Bangladeshi stage actresses
Bangladeshi theatre directors
Recipients of the Ekushey Padak